The Bryant Bulldogs women's basketball team represents Bryant University in NCAA Division I women's basketball. The team currently competes in the America East Conference.

History
The Bulldogs began play in Division I in 2008 after 31 years in Division II. Previously, they played in the Northeast-8/10 Conference. The Bulldogs made the Women's Basketball Invitational in 2014.

Postseason

NCAA Division II tournament results
The Bulldogs made seven appearances in the NCAA Division II women's basketball tournament. They had a combined record of 2–7.

References

External links